Mollanepes is a town and capital of Wekilbazar District, Mary Province, Turkmenistan. It is located approximately 10 kilometers east of the city of Mary.

Etymology
The official name is "Town named for Mollanepes". The town was renamed by decree in 1993 in honor of a prominent 19th-century Turkmen writer, Kadyrberdy Ogly Mollanepes. Prior to that it was named in honor of Pavel Poltoratskiy, a Russian revolutionary.

Transportation
Mollanepes is served by the M37 highway, a rail station on the Trans-Caspian Railway, the Karakum Canal, and the Mary International Airport.

References

Populated places in Mary Region